The Levant is an approximate historical geographical term referring to a large area in the Eastern Mediterranean region of Western Asia. In its narrowest sense, which is in use today in archaeology and other cultural contexts, it is equivalent to a stretch of land bordering the Mediterranean in southwestern Asia, i.e. the historical region of Syria ("Greater Syria"), which includes present-day Israel, Jordan, Lebanon, Palestine, Syria and most of Turkey southwest of the middle Euphrates. Its overwhelming characteristic is that it represents the land bridge between Africa and Eurasia. In its widest historical sense, the Levant included all of the Eastern Mediterranean with its islands; that is, it included all of the countries along the Eastern Mediterranean shores, extending from Greece to Cyrenaica in eastern Libya.

The term entered English in the late 15th century from French. It derives from the Italian , meaning "rising", implying the rising of the Sun in the east, and is broadly equivalent to the term al-Mashriq, meaning "the eastern place, where the Sun rises".

In the 13th and 14th centuries, the term levante was used for Italian maritime commerce in the Eastern Mediterranean, including Greece, Anatolia, Syria-Palestine, and Egypt, that is, the lands east of Venice. Eventually the term was restricted to the Muslim countries of Syria-Palestine and Egypt. In 1581, England set up the Levant Company to monopolize commerce with the Ottoman Empire. The name Levant States was used to refer to the French mandate over Syria and Lebanon after World War I. This is probably the reason why the term Levant has come to be used more specifically to refer to modern Syria, Lebanon, Palestine, Israel, Jordan, and Cyprus. Some scholars mistakenly believed that it derives from the name of Lebanon. Today the term is often used in conjunction with prehistoric or ancient historical references. It has the same meaning as "Syria-Palestine" or Ash-Shaam, the area that is bounded by the Taurus Mountains of Turkey in the north, the Mediterranean Sea in the west, the north Arabian Desert and Mesopotamia in the east, and Sinai in the south (which can be fully included or not). Typically, it does not include Anatolia (also called Asia Minor), the Caucasus Mountains, or any part of the Arabian Peninsula proper. Cilicia (in Asia Minor) and the Sinai Peninsula (Asian Egypt) are sometimes included.

As a name for the contemporary region, several dictionaries consider Levant to be archaic today. Both the noun Levant and the adjective Levantine are now commonly used to describe the ancient and modern culture area formerly called Syro-Palestinian or Biblical: archaeologists now speak of the Levant and of Levantine archaeology; food scholars speak of Levantine cuisine; and the Latin Christians of the Levant continue to be called Levantine Christians.

The Levant has been described as the "crossroads of Western Asia, the Eastern Mediterranean, and Northeast Africa", and in geological (tectonic) terms as the "northwest of the Arabian Plate". The populations of the Levant share not only the geographic position, but cuisine, some customs, and history. They are often referred to as Levantines.

Etymology

The term Levant appears in English in 1497, and originally meant 'the East' or 'Mediterranean lands east of Italy'. It is borrowed from the French  'rising', referring to the rising of the sun in the east, or the point where the sun rises. The phrase is ultimately from the Latin word , meaning 'lift, raise'. Similar etymologies are found in Greek  Anatolē (cf. Anatolia 'the direction of sunrise'), in Germanic Morgenland, in Italian (as in Riviera di Levante, the portion of the Liguria coast east of Genoa), in Hungarian Kelet ('east'), in Spanish and Catalan Levante and Llevant, ('the place of rising'), and in Hebrew  mizraḥ  ('east'). Most notably, "Orient" and its Latin source oriens meaning 'east', is literally "rising", deriving from Latin orior 'rise'.

The notion of the Levant has undergone a dynamic process of historical evolution in usage, meaning, and understanding. While the term "Levantine" originally referred to the European residents of the eastern Mediterranean region, it later came to refer to regional "native" and "minority" groups.

The term became current in English in the 16th century, along with the first English merchant adventurers in the region; English ships appeared in the Mediterranean in the 1570s, and the English merchant company signed its agreement ("capitulations") with the Ottoman Sultan in 1579. The English Levant Company was founded in 1581 to trade with the Ottoman Empire, and in 1670 the French Compagnie du Levant was founded for the same purpose. At this time, the Far East was known as the "Upper Levant".

In early 19th-century travel writing, the term sometimes incorporated certain Mediterranean provinces of the Ottoman empire, as well as independent Greece (and especially the Greek islands). In 19th-century archaeology, it referred to overlapping cultures in this region during and after prehistoric times, intending to reference the place instead of any one culture. The French mandate of Syria and Lebanon (1920–1946) was called the Levant states.

Geography and modern-day use of the term

Today, "Levant" is the term typically used by archaeologists and historians with reference to the history of the region. Scholars have adopted the term Levant to identify the region due to its being a "wider, yet relevant, cultural corpus" that does not have the "political overtones" of Syria-Palestine. The term is also used for modern events, peoples, states or parts of states in the same region, namely Cyprus, Egypt, Iraq, Israel, Jordan, Lebanon, Palestine, Syria, and Turkey are sometimes considered Levant countries (compare with Near East, Middle East, Eastern Mediterranean and Western Asia). Several researchers include the island of Cyprus in Levantine studies, including the Council for British Research in the Levant, the UCLA Near Eastern Languages and Cultures department, Journal of Levantine Studies and the UCL Institute of Archaeology, the last of which has dated the connection between Cyprus and mainland Levant to the early Iron Age. Archaeologists seeking a neutral orientation that is neither biblical nor national have used terms such as Levantine archaeology and archaeology of the Southern Levant.

While the usage of the term "Levant" in academia has been restricted to the fields of archeology and literature, there is a recent attempt to reclaim the notion of the Levant as a category of analysis in political and social sciences. Two academic journals were launched in the early 2010s using the word: the Journal of Levantine Studies, published by the Van Leer Jerusalem Institute and The Levantine Review, published by Boston College.

The word Levant has been used in some translations of the term ash-Shām as used by the organization known as ISIL, ISIS, and other names, though there is disagreement as to whether this translation is accurate.

In archaeology: a definition
In The Oxford Handbook of the Archaeology of the Levant: c. 8000–332 BCE (OHAL; 2013), the definition of the Levant for the specific purposes of the book is synonymous to that of the Arabic "bilad al-sham, 'the land of sham [Syria]'", translating in Western parlance to greater Syria. OHAL defines the boundaries of the Levant as follows.
 To the north: the Taurus Mountains or the Plain of 'Amuq
 To the east: the eastern deserts, i.e. (from north to south) the Euphrates and the Jebel el-Bishrī area for the northern Levant, followed by the Syrian Desert east of the eastern hinterland of the Anti-Lebanon range (whose southernmost part is Mount Hermon), and Transjordan's highlands and eastern desert (also discussed at Syrian Desert, also known as the Badia region). In other words, Mesopotamia and the North Arabian Desert.
 To the south: Wadi al-Arish in Sinai
 To the west: the Mediterranean Sea

Subregions
A distinction is made between the main subregions of the Levant, the northern and the southern:
 The Litani River marks the division between the Northern Levant and the Southern Levant.
The island of Cyprus is also included as a third subregion in the archaeological region of the Levant:
 Cyprus, geographically distinct from the Levant, is included due to its proximity and natural resources (copper in particular), which induced close cultural ties.

History

Demographics and religion

The largest religious group in the Levant are Muslims and the largest cultural-linguistic group are Arabs. Muslim Arabs became the majority due to the Muslim conquest of the Levant in the 7th century and subsequent Arabization of the region. The majority of Muslim Levantines are Sunni with Alawi and Shia minorities. Other large ethnic groups in the Levant include Jews, Maronites, Turks, Turkmens, Antiochian Greeks, Assyrians, Yazidi, Kurds, Druze and Armenians.

There are many Levantine Christian groups such as Greek, Oriental Orthodox (mainly Syriac Orthodox, Coptic, Georgian, and Maronite), Roman Catholic, Nestorian, and Protestant. Armenians mostly belong to the Armenian Apostolic Church. There are Levantines or Franco-Levantines who are mostly Roman Catholic. There are also Circassians, Turks, Samaritans, and Nawars. There are Assyrian peoples belonging to the Assyrian Church of the East (autonomous) and the Chaldean Catholic Church (Catholic).

In addition, this region has a number of sites that are of religious significance, such as Masjid Al-Aqsa, Antioch in Hatay, the Church of the Holy Sepulchre, and the Western Wall in Jerusalem.

Language

Most populations in the Levant speak Levantine Arabic, usually classified as the varieties North Levantine Arabic in Lebanon, Syria, and parts of Turkey, and South Levantine Arabic in Palestine and Jordan. Each of these encompasses a spectrum of regional or urban/rural variations. In addition to the varieties normally grouped together as "Levantine", a number of other varieties and dialects of Arabic are spoken in the Levant area, such as Levantine Bedawi Arabic and Mesopotamian Arabic.

Among the languages of Israel, the official language is Hebrew; Arabic was until July 19, 2018, also an official language. The Arab minority, in 2018 about 21% of the population of Israel, speaks a dialect of Levantine Arabic essentially indistinguishable from the forms spoken in the Palestinian territories.

Of the languages of Cyprus, the two official languages are Turkish and Greek. The most used languages by population are Greek in the south followed by Turkish in the north. Two minority languages are recognized: Armenian, and Cypriot Maronite Arabic, a hybrid of mostly medieval Arabic vernaculars with strong influence from contact with Turkish and Greek, spoken by approximately 1,000 people.

Some communities and populations speak Aramaic, Greek, Armenian, Circassian, French, Russian, or English.

See also
Overlapping regional designations
 Fertile Crescent
 Mashriq
 Mesopotamia
 Middle East
 Near East
 Western Asia

Subregional designations
 Southern Levant

Others
 French post offices in the Ottoman Empire ("Levant" stamps)
 History of the Levant
 Islamic State of Iraq and the Levant (Referred to in current events as ISIL or ISIS)
 Levantine Sea
 Levantines (Latin Christians), Catholic Europeans in the Levant

Other places in the east of a larger region
 Levante, Spain
 Riviera di Levante, Italy

Explanatory notes

Citations

General and cited references

Further reading
 Julia Chatzipanagioti: Griechenland, Zypern, Balkan und Levante. Eine kommentierte Bibliographie der Reiseliteratur des 18. Jahrhunderts. 2 Vol. Eutin 2006. .
 Levantine Heritage site. Includes many oral and scholarly histories, and genealogies for some Levantine Turkish families.
 Philip Mansel, Levant: Splendour and Catastrophe on the Mediterranean, London, John Murray, 11 November 2010, hardback, 480 pages, New Haven, Yale University Press, 24 May 2011, hardback, 470 pages, .

External links

 France and the Levant

 
Eastern Mediterranean
Geography of Cyprus
Geography of Hatay Province
Geography of Israel
Geography of Jordan
Geography of Lebanon
Geography of Syria
Geography of the Middle East
Geography of the State of Palestine
Historical regions
History of Western Asia
Near East
Regions of Asia
Regions of Europe